The following lists events that happened during 1918 in New Zealand.

The jubilation over the end of World War I was overshadowed by the Spanish flu pandemic reaching New Zealand. In four months, it is estimated that over 8600 New Zealanders died of the disease and between one third and one half of the population were infected.
The death rate for Māori was estimated at 42 per thousand (approx 2,160 deaths) compared to 5.6 per 1000 (6,400 deaths) for European New Zealanders.

Incumbents

Regal and viceregal
 Head of State  – George V
 Governor-General – Arthur Foljambe, 2nd Earl of Liverpool

Government
The 19th New Zealand Parliament continues for a fourth year as a grand coalition led by the Reform Party.
 Speaker of the House – Frederic Lang (Reform Party)
 Prime Minister – William Massey (Reform Party)
 Minister of Finance –  Joseph Ward (Liberal Party)

Parliamentary opposition
 Leader of the Opposition – Joseph Ward (Liberal Party). Ward retains the title even though he is part of the coalition government.

Judiciary
 Chief Justice – Sir Robert Stout

Main centre leaders
 Mayor of Auckland – James Gunson
 Mayor of Wellington – John Luke
 Mayor of Christchurch – Henry Holland
 Mayor of Dunedin – James Clark

Events 
 19–20 March: Raetihi Forest Fire kills 3 and destroys over 150 homes.
 Early October: The first cases of Spanish flu are recorded in Auckland.
 12 October: Troop ship RMS Niagara returns, carrying a number of people ill with influenza. It is not quarantined. William Massey and Joseph Ward are aboard. Although later cited as the cause of the Spanish flu epidemic, 6 persons had already died in the 3 days preceding its arrival.
 18 November: Influenza is "hastily" gazetted as a notifiable disease.  
 December: The flu epidemic eases. Over 8600 have died including at least 1260 Māori.
 2 December: Aviation Act 1918, to control aviation in New Zealand, is passed by Parliament.

Undated
Parliament moves into Parliament House although it is not yet completed.

Arts and literature

See 1918 in art, 1918 in literature, :Category:1918 books

Music

See: 1918 in music

Film

See: 1918 in film, List of New Zealand feature films, Cinema of New Zealand, :Category:1918 films

Sport

Golf
 The New Zealand Open championship was not held due to the war.

Horse racing

Harness racing
 New Zealand Trotting Cup – Author Dillon
 Auckland Trotting Cup – Harold Junior

Thoroughbred racing
 New Zealand Cup – Sasanof
 Auckland Cup – Mascot
 Wellington Cup – Nobleman
 New Zealand Derby – Gloaming

Lawn bowls
The national outdoor lawn bowls championships are held in Dunedin.
 Men's singles champion – W. Foster (Caledonian Bowling Club)
 Men's pair champions – W.M. Hogg, E. Harraway (skip) (Dunedin Bowling Club)
 Men's fours champions – W. Robson, J. Spinks, E. Falconer, C.R. Smith (skip) (Otago Bowling Club)

Rugby union
 The Ranfurly Shield (held by Wellington) is not contested as interprovincial matches are cancelled due to the war.

Soccer
Provincial league champions:
	Auckland:	North Shore
	Canterbury:	Excelsior
	Hawke's Bay:	Waipukurau
	Otago:	Southern Dunedin
	Southland:	No competition
	Wanganui:	No competition
	Wellington:	Porirua

Births

January–March
 4 January – Anne Elder, ballet dancer, poet
 5 January
 Roy Cowan, potter, illustrator, printmaker
 Margaret Marks, cricketer
 Joyce Sullivan, netball player
 7 January – Colin Snedden, cricket player and commentator
 11 January – John Mackey, Roman Catholic bishop
 15 January – Arthur Kinsella, politician
 19 January – Mihi Edwards, writer, social worker, teacher
 28 January – Trevor Skeet, lawyer, politician
 5 February – Joe Ongley, cricket player and administrator, lawyer, jurist
 24 February − Daniel Watkins, agrochemical distributor and manufacturer
 26 February – Lloyd Geering, theologian
 27 February – Brian Carbury, World War II fighter pilot
 14 March – Ivan Lichter, thoracic surgeon, palliative care pioneer
 17 March – Patrick Eisdell Moore, otolaryngologist
 21 March – Lloyd White, diplomat
 25 March – Nazmi Mehmeti, Muslim community leader
 30 March – Elva Bett, artist, art historian, art gallery director

April–June
 6 April – Jimmy Kemp, cricketer
 7 April – Moana-Nui-a-Kiwa Ngarimu, soldier, Victoria Cross recipient
 16 April – Roger Mirams, film producer and director
 17 April – Dorothea Horsman, women's rights advocate
 18 April – Patrick O'Dea, public servant
 27 April – Douglas Dumbleton, cricket player and umpire
 11 May – John O'Sullivan, cricketer
 18 May – Walter Metcalf, physical chemist
 19 May – Nevile Lodge, cartoonist
 26 May – Freda Bream, author
 8 June – George Edward Hughes, philosopher and logician
 22 June – Mana Strickland, Cook Islands educator and politician
 27 June – Edgar Kain, World War II fighter pilot

July–September
 1 July – Clive Boyce, local-body politician
 31 July – Frank Renouf, businessman, philanthropist
 8 August – Logan Sloane, politician
 9 August – Frank Rennie, soldier
 12 August – Sid Hurst, farmer
 30 August – Laurie Francis, diplomat and lawyer
 11 September – Desmond Scott, World War II fighter pilot
 15 September – Phil Lamason, World War II bomber pilot and prisoner-of-war leader
 21 September – Avis Higgs, textile designer, painter
 23 September – Douglas Bagnall, air force officer

October–December
 1 October – Gloria Rawlinson, writer and editor
 4 October – Gordon Burgess, cricket player and administrator
 8 October – Olga Jekyll, fencer
 22 October – Marcel Stanley, philatelist
 24 October – Frank O'Flynn, lawyer, politician
 2 November – Robbie Robson, lawn bowls player
 4 November – Sidney Koreneff, World War II French resistance worker, newspaper managing director, Anglican priest
 12 November – Denis Miller, World War II bomber pilot, airline pilot
 15 November – Neil Williams, water polo player
 16 November – Frank Newhook, plant pathologist
 23 November – Gordon Bisson, jurist
 29 November – Mick Holland, speedway rider, stock car racing pioneer
 9 December – Harold Cassie, cricket umpire
 12 December – Neville Thornton, rugby union player, school principal

Exact date unknown
 The Hawk, Thoroughbred racehorse
 Night Raid, Thoroughbred racehorse

Deaths

January–March
 8 January – Taare Parata, politician (born 1865)
 2 February – Arthur Hume, public servant (born 1838)
 3 February – Ernest Hoben, rugby union administrator (born 1864)
 6 February – Sir Henry Miller, politician (born 1830)
 17 February – Harry Bedford, politician, university lecturer (born 1877)
 18 February – William Morgan, politician (born 1851)
 20 February – Gerhard Mueller, surveyor, engineer, land commissioner (born 1835)
 24 February
 Luke Adams, potter (born 1838)
 Victor Spencer, soldier (born 1896)
 12 March – Andrew Maginnity, politician (born 1849)
 29 March – Harry Fulton, army officer (born 1869)

April–June
 9 April – Hubert Turtill, rugby union and rugby league player (born 1880)
 30 April – Eric Harper, rugby union player, athlete (born 1877)
 9 May – Richard Hutton Davies, soldier (born 1861)
 11 May – Felix Hunger, farmer, coloniser (born 1837)
 3 June – Jane McBride, hotel proprietor (born )
 4 June – Hāmiora Mangakāhia, Ngāti Whanaunga leader, politician (born 1838)
 9 June – Charles Fell, barrister, artist, politician, mayor of Nelson (1882–87) (born 1844)
 11 June – Charles Gray, politician, mayor of Christchurch (1891–92) (born 1853)
 13 June – Charles Johnston, politician, mayor of Wellington (1890) (born 1845)
 28 June – Alexander Turnbull, bibliophile (born 1868)

July–September
 10 July – Charles Rawlins, politician (born 1846)
 14 July – Samuel Farr, architect (born 1827)
 22 July – Thomas Tanner, politician (born 1830)
 23 July
 William Barnes, blacksmith, labour reformer (born 1827)
 Albert Rowland, race walker (born 1885)
 25 July – Richard Travis, soldier, Victoria Cross recipient (born 1884)
 30 July – Alexander Hatrick, merchant, shipowner, tourist entrepreneur, politician, mayor of Wanganui (1897–1904) (born 1857)
 31 July – Henry Suter, zoologist (born 1841)
 20 August
 William Campbell, Presbyterian minister (born 1840)
 Richard Meredith, politician (born 1843)
 24 August – Samuel Forsyth, soldier, VIctoria Cross recipient (born 1891)
 25 August – Jack Arnst, racing cyclist (born 1883)
 4 September – Robert Fletcher, politician (born 1863)
 6 September – Elizabeth Yates, first female mayor in the British Empire (born 1845)
 8 September – Tony Foster, school principal and inspector, university lecturer (born 1853)
 11 September – Ernie Dodd, rugby union player (born 1880)
 13 September – Henry Okey, politician (born 1857)
 14 September – Charles Macintosh, rugby union player, politician, mayor of Timaru (1901–02) (born 1869)
 22 September – Joseph Joel Hammond, aviator (born 1886)
 29 September
 George McMurtry, chemical engineer, mining manager, orchardist (born 1867)
 Lawrence Weathers, soldier, Victoria Cross recipient (born 1890)

October–December
 23 October – Henry James Nicholas, soldier, Victoria Cross recipient (born 1891)
 29 October – Charles Adams, surveyor, astronomer, public servant (born 1840)
 1 November – Albert Gourlay, Australian rules footballer (born 1881)
 5 November – Jimmy Ridland, rugby union player (born 1882)
 6 November – George Stephenson, auctioneer, rugby player, impresario (born 1874)
 11 November – Andrew Rutherford, politician (born 1842)
 13 November – Alfred Hindmarsh, politician (born 1860)
 15 November – Iraia Te Whaiti, farmer, Ngāti Kahungunu leader and historian (born 1861)
 16 November – Ned Sale, cricketer (born 1883)
 17 November – Helen Smith, clothing manufacturer and retailer (born 1873)
 18 November – David Buick, politician (born 1848)
 21 November – William Gibbes, cricketer (born 1880)
 23 November – Michael Verdon, Roman Catholic bishop (born 1838)
 28 November – Margaret Cruickshank, doctor (born 1873)
 29 November – Heremia Te Wake, Te Rarawa leader, catechist (born 1830s)
 8 December – Margaret Burn, school teacher and principal (born 1825)
 10 December – Francis Petre, architect (born 1847)
 12 December – Louis Steele, artist and engraver (born 1842)
 18 December – Jim Gilmour, rugby league player (born 1881)

See also
History of New Zealand
List of years in New Zealand
Military history of New Zealand
Timeline of New Zealand history
Timeline of New Zealand's links with Antarctica
Timeline of the New Zealand environment

References

External links